WBR may refer to:

 Warner Bros. Records, an American record label
 WBR Sessions, an EP recorded by Guster 
 The Welsh Boat Race, an annual rowing race River Tawe or River Taff in South Wales also known as the Welsh University Boat Race and The Welsh Varsity Boat Race
 World Bicycle Relief, USA based charity organization
 Willie Revillame, a Filipino musician, businessman, and TV Host
 WBR, the IATA airport code for Roben-Hood Airport in Michigan, United States
 WBR, the National Rail station code for Whaley Bridge railway station, in Derbyshire, England
 , a HTML tag for an optional word break
 Wood Brothers Racing, a NASCAR team.